The Highline Times is an American weekly newspaper serving the community of Burien, Washington, a city south of Seattle, Washington.

The newspaper is a part of Robinson Newspapers, which includes the Federal Way News, the  Des Moines News, the White Center News, West Seattle Herald, and the Ballard News-Tribune.

See also

List of newspapers in Washington (state)

External links
 Official website

Publications with year of establishment missing
Burien, Washington
Newspapers published in Washington (state)
Weekly newspapers published in the United States